Chief Cornstalk Wildlife Management Area is located on  in Mason County near Southside, West Virginia.  Second growth oak-hickory and mixed hardwoods forests cover much of the rolling and moderately steep slopes. Chief Cornstalk WMA can be reached either on Nine Mile Creek Road off US 35 near Southside, or by Crab Creek Road from State Route 2, south of Gallipolis Ferry.

Hunting, fishing and trapping
Hunting opportunities include deer, squirrel, turkey and grouse. A small lake provides fishing opportunities for largemouth bass, bluegill and channel catfish, as well as stocked trout. A special permit is required to pursue trapping of muskrat, raccoon, mink or fox.

A shooting range is available for gun enthusiasts.  Rustic camping sites are available for tents and small trailers.

See also

Animal conservation
Animal trapping
Chief Cornstalk
Fishing
Hunting
List of West Virginia wildlife management areas

References

External links
 West Virginia DNR District 5 Wildlife Management Areas
West Virginia Hunting Regulations
West Virginia Fishing Regulations
WVDNR map of Chief Cornstalk Wildlife Management Area

Campgrounds in West Virginia
Protected areas of Mason County, West Virginia
Wildlife management areas of West Virginia
IUCN Category V